Karol Żurek (born January 28, 1949) is a former Polish ice hockey player. He played for Poland men's national ice hockey team at the 1976 Winter Olympics in Innsbruck.

References

1949 births
Living people
Baildon Katowice players
Ice hockey players at the 1976 Winter Olympics
Olympic ice hockey players of Poland
Polish ice hockey centres
Sportspeople from Katowice